The 1990–91 Segunda División was the 42nd season of the Mexican Segunda División. The season started on 3 August 1990 and concluded on 17 July 1991. It was won by Atlante.

Changes 
 León was promoted to Primera División.
 Atlante was relegated from Primera División.
 Querétaro was promoted to Primera División after bought the Tampico Madero franchise. Pioneros de Cancún bought the Querétaro spot in Segunda División.
 Cachorros Zamora and Guerreros Acapulco were promoted from Segunda División B.
 Zitlaltepec was promoted from Tercera División.
 SUOO, Galicia and Ayense were relegated from Segunda División.
 Petroleros Salina Cruz license was bought by Real Celaya.

Teams

Group stage

Group 1

Group 2

Group 3

Group 4

Results

Final stage

Group 1

Group 2

Final

References 

1990–91 in Mexican football
Segunda División de México seasons